(born July 1, 1994) is a Japanese fashion model and actress.

Filmography

Dramas
Garo (2005)
1 Litre of Tears (2005)
Koisuru Nichiyobi 3rd Series (2007; episode 25 "Sanshimai") - starring
Sexy Voice and Robo (2007) 
Tokyo Shojo (2008) - starring
Shōkōjo Seira (2009) - starring
LADY ~Saigo no Hanzai Profile~ (2011)
Nazotoki wa Dinner no Ato de (2011)
Mannequin Girls (2011)
Juhō2405 Watashi ga Shinu Wake (2012)
Switch Girl!! 2 (2012)
Vampire Heaven (2013)
Sennyū Tantei Tokage (2013)
Seventeen Killer (2013)
Akka (2014)
Ouroboros~Kono Ai Koso Seigi (2015)

Movies
Smile: Seiya no Kiseki (2007)
Sunadokei (2008)
Yatterman (2009)
Intern! (2016), Maki

PV
Yui "Laugh Away" (2008)
Yui "Laugh away ~ YUI Acoustic version ~" (2008)
Yui "Summer Song" (2008)
Yui "Gloria" (2010)

References

External links
 
 Official profile
 Official blog

1994 births
Living people
Japanese television actresses
Japanese film actresses
Japanese female models
Japanese television personalities
People from Tokyo
Stardust Promotion artists
21st-century Japanese actresses
Models from Tokyo Metropolis